Norton Branch is a stream in Carter County of the U.S. state of Kentucky. It is a tributary of Williams Creek.

Norton Branch takes its name from Col. E. M. Norton, proprietor of the local Norton Iron Works.

See also
List of rivers of Kentucky

References

Rivers of Carter County, Kentucky
Rivers of Kentucky